Season 2007–08 was the 124th football season in which Dumbarton competed at a Scottish national level, entering the Scottish Football League for the 102nd time, the Scottish Cup for the 113th time, the Scottish League Cup for the 61st time and the Scottish Challenge Cup for the 17th time.

Overview 
Dumbarton's second successive season in the Third Division was not to be a successful one.  A large intake of new players at the start was not the success that was hoped for and the mixed start which saw the club hold 5th place at the end of October was only to be followed by a slump in form.  By the end of November Gerry McCabe had left the club to be replaced by Jim Chapman, but performances did little to improve the situation and in the end a disappointing 8th place was achieved.

In the Scottish Cup, a cup-run of sorts was gained.  Early round victories over Forfar Athletic and Berwick Rangers was followed by a fourth round exit to Premier League St Mirren.
 
In the League Cup, Dumbarton lost in the first round to Cowdenbeath.

Finally, it would be another early League Challenge Cup exit, this time to East Stirling.

Locally, in the Stirlingshire Cup, a win and a defeat in the opening group ties was never going to be enough to progress to the final.

Results & fixtures

Scottish Third Division

CIS League Cup

Scottish League Challenge Cup

Scottish Cup

Stirlingshire Cup

Pre-season

League table

Player statistics

Squad 

|}

Transfers

Players in

Players out

See also
 2007–08 in Scottish football

References

External links
Anton Nugent (Dumbarton Football Club Historical Archive)
Peter Shaw (Dumbarton Football Club Historical Archive)
Kenny Haswell (Dumbarton Football Club Historical Archive)
Richie McKillen (Dumbarton Football Club Historical Archive)
Jonathan Yule (Dumbarton Football Club Historical Archive)
Kieran Brannan (Dumbarton Football Club Historical Archive)
Jason McLauchlin (Dumbarton Football Club Historical Archive)
Michael Stokes (Dumbarton Football Club Historical Archive)
Tommy Coyne (Dumbarton Football Club Historical Archive)
Liam Cusack (Dumbarton Football Club Historical Archive)
Ryan Russell (Dumbarton Football Club Historical Archive)
Kenneth Wright (Dumbarton Football Club Historical Archive)
Scottish Football Historical Archive

Dumbarton F.C. seasons
Scottish football clubs 2007–08 season